Richmond Tea Room was a tea room and literary café in Buenos Aires, Argentina.

It was notable as the meeting place of the Florida group of writers: Oliverio Girondo, Norah Lange, Ricardo Güiraldes, Norah Borges, Péle Pastorino, Francisco Luis Bernárdez, Leopoldo Marechal, Conrado Nalé Roxlo, and Raúl González Tuñón, among others.

Jorge Luis Borges and Lawrence Durrell was also another usual visitor of this café.

References

Argentine literature
Coffeehouses and cafés in Argentina
Tourist attractions in Buenos Aires
Restaurants established in 1917
1917 establishments in Argentina
Restaurants disestablished in 2011
2011 disestablishments in Argentina
Defunct restaurants in Argentina
Defunct food and drink companies of Argentina
Food and drink companies based in Buenos Aires